Alastor sulcatus is a species of wasp in the family Vespidae.

References

sulcatus